Joseph Herman Lewis (January 17, 1895 – October, 1986), nicknamed "Sleepy", was an American Negro league catcher in the 1920s and 1930s.

A native of Drakes Branch, Virginia, Lewis made his Negro leagues debut in 1920 with the Baltimore Black Sox. He spent many years playing for the Hilldale Club, and was part of their 1925 Colored World Series championship team. Lewis died in Portsmouth, Virginia in 1986 at age 91.

References

External links
 and Baseball-Reference Black Baseball stats and Seamheads

1895 births
1986 deaths
Bacharach Giants players
Baltimore Black Sox players
Brooklyn Royal Giants players
Hilldale Club players
Lincoln Giants players
Washington Potomacs players
20th-century African-American sportspeople
Baseball catchers